1999 Belarusian First League was the ninth season of 2nd level football championship in Belarus. The season started in April 1999 and ended in October 1999.

Team changes from 1998 season
The two best teams of the 1998 Belarusian First League (Lida and Svisloch-Krovlya Osipovichi) were promoted to Belarusian Premier League. They were replaced by Kommunalnik Slonim, the last-placed team of 1998 Premier League (only one team has relegated due to Dinamo-93 Minsk dissolution midway through 1998 season).

Two lowest placed teams of the 1998 First League season (Veino and Belenergostroy Beloozyorsk) relegated to the Second League. They were replaced by two best teams of 1998 Second League (Zvezda-VA-BGU Minsk and Granit Mikashevichi as the winners of their respective groups).

During the off-season Belcard Grodno (placed 8th last year) merged with Premier League club Neman Grodno (with the latter being renamed to Neman-Belcard Grodno). To fill the two vacant spots, Veino were spared from relegation, and Neman Mosty (placed 3rd in Second League Group B last year) were additionally promoted. Neman Mosty were invited since Veras Nesvizh (Second League Group A runners-up) refused promotion and Gomel-2 (Second League Group B runners-up) were ineligible.

Before the start of the season Dinamo-Energogaz Vitebsk were renamed to Vitbich-Dinamo-Energo Vitebsk and FC Veino were renamed to Veino-Dnepr after becoming a farm club of Dnepr-Transmash Mogilev. FC Bereza merged with Keramik Bereza from the Second league and adopted the latter's club name as their own.

Overview
The two highest placing teams of the season (Kommunalnik Slonim and Vedrich-97 Rechitsa) were promoted to the Premier League, and the two lowest placed teams (Pinsk-900 and Vitbich-Dinamo-Energo Vitebsk) were relegated to the Second League. Vitbich-Dinamo-Energo Vitebsk subsequently disbanded before the next season.

Teams and locations

League table

Top goalscorers

See also
1999 Belarusian Premier League
1998–99 Belarusian Cup
1999–2000 Belarusian Cup

External links
RSSSF

Belarusian First League seasons
2
Belarus
Belarus